Kaʻena Ridge, also referred to as the Kaʻena Volcano, is a submerged remnant of an ancient shield volcano that is to the north of and once comprised the northern section of the Hawaiian Island of Oʻahu.

Geology 
Kaʻena Ridge was the oldest of the three volcanoes to form Oʻahu and it was also the shortest when it grew out of sea level. It was about 3,000 ft.

Activity from Kaʻena began roughly 5 million years ago. Despite being Oʻahu's oldest volcano, it broke sea level 400,000 years after the Waiʻanae did. This is due to Kaʻena being built on a lower sea depth, whereas other Oʻahu volcanoes were built on pre-existing ridges.

Around 3 million years ago, Kaʻena, Waiʻanae and Koʻolau simultaneously emerged. Kaʻena would later submerge below sea level at an unknown date.

In its current state, the crest of the Kaʻena Ridge extends 35-55 km wide and is located 75-100 km northwest of Kaʻena Point, the westernmost tip of Oʻahu.

See also
List of volcanoes in the Hawaiian – Emperor seamount chain

References

Volcanoes of Oahu
Hawaiian–Emperor seamount chain
Extinct volcanoes
Polygenetic shield volcanoes
Pliocene shield volcanoes
Pleistocene shield volcanoes
Neogene Oceania
Cenozoic Hawaii